The following lists events that happened during 2015 in Vietnam.

Incumbents
Party General Secretary: Nguyễn Phú Trọng
President: Trương Tấn Sang 
Prime Minister: Nguyễn Tấn Dũng

Events

January
 January 1 - Vietnam’s new marriage law goes into effect. Same-sex marriages are no longer prohibited, but are not recognized as being legally valid.
 January 3 - Bulk Jupiter, a Norwegian cargo ship, sinks off the coast of Vietnam, with eighteen dead and one survivor.

References

See also
 Years in Vietnam

 
Vietnam
Years of the 21st century in Vietnam
2010s in Vietnam
Vietnam